Hathaway Cottage is a historic cure cottage located at Saranac Lake, Franklin County, New York. Built in 1900, it is a two-story, three bay wood frame residence with a jerkin-head roof and a prominent jerkin-head dormer and cure porch on the second floor over the first floor verandah.

It was listed on the National Register of Historic Places in 1992.

References

Houses on the National Register of Historic Places in New York (state)
Queen Anne architecture in New York (state)
Colonial Revival architecture in New York (state)
Houses completed in 1900
Houses in Franklin County, New York
National Register of Historic Places in Franklin County, New York